Shirui National Park is a national park located in the state of Manipur in India. It was established in 1982. Among the animals that make their homes here include tragopan, tiger and leopard. It is here that the famous shirui lily (Lilium mackliniae) grows naturally. The main peak of Siroy abounds with flowers during the monsoon and it is a veritable paradise.

The Shirui Kashong Peak near Ukhrul is a marvelous hill top view point located at a height of 2,835 meters above sea level.

A number of rivers originate from the cracks and slopes of this peak. The exotic Shirui lily flower (Lilium mackliniae) blooms on the hilltop in May/June. The flower attracts hundreds of scientists and tourists every year.

Rare birds like Blyth's Tragopan and Mrs. Hume's bar-backed pheasant inhabit the hill top.

In the park, natural life is supported by an undisturbed biological system.

Flora
It has dense tropical forests all over and temperate forest in the hilltops.

Sources

National parks in Manipur
Protected areas established in 1982
1982 establishments in Manipur